Anitha Shaiq, often credited as Anitha. S is an Indian playback singer and music composer, living in Mumbai, India. She performs Indian classical, sufi, Ghazal, folk and pop music, having sung in Malayalam, Kannada, Telugu, Oriya, Punjabi, and Tamil languages. In her 12 years in the film industry, she has recorded more than 100 songs for films.

Early life
Anitha Shaiq was born to Sirajuniza Begum, a secondary school music teacher, and Sheikh Ebrahim. She graduated from the Government College for Women, majoring in music. She has studied Hindustani, Sufi, Carnatic, and Western music.

Career

Composing
Shaiq composed the song "Melake Ponnal" for the film Crossroad directed by Lenin Rajendran.

Playback singing
Shaiq began her play back singing in 2007 with the hit song of that year composed by Sree. Vidyasagar. She has sung for many Malayalam, Tamil, Hindi and Kannada movies.

Musical albums

"Satrangee" is composed and sung by Anitha Shaiq, while it was produced by East Coast.The album consists of seven tracks written by legends like, Meera, Mirza Ghalib, Bulleh Shah, Amir Khusrow etc..The album was launched by the famous Indian Sufi singer Kailash Kher on 20 January 2015.

Live performances

Anitha has performed live concerts all over India, UAE, Bahrain, Qatar, Europe.

Discography

Awards and honours

Anitha received JESSEY Awards, Lions Club Musical Award, and GMMA Award and was nominated for the "Best singer" in the Asianet Film Awards.

References

External links
 https://web.archive.org/web/20150203125329/http://www.kaumudi.com/innerpage1.php?newsid=60397
 

Indian women composers
21st-century Indian composers
Living people
Year of birth missing (living people)
Place of birth missing (living people)
Malayalam playback singers
Tamil playback singers
Indian women playback singers
Indian women classical singers
21st-century Indian women singers
21st-century Indian singers
Singers from Thiruvananthapuram
Women musicians from Kerala
Indian folk-pop singers
21st-century women composers